Robert Vernon Denney (April 11, 1916 – June 26, 1981) was an American politician and judge who served in the United States House of Representatives for Nebraska's 1st congressional district and federal judge of the United States District Court for the District of Nebraska. He was a member of the Republican Party.

Education and career

Born in Council Bluffs, Iowa, Denney graduated from Fairbury High School in 1933. He attended Peru State Teachers College and the University of Nebraska from 1933 to 1936, and received a Bachelor of Laws from Creighton University School of Law in 1939. He practiced law in Fairbury, Nebraska from 1939 to 1940 and then became a special agent for Federal Bureau of Investigation from 1940 to 1941, serving in Washington, D.C. and Chicago, Illinois. He enlisted in the United States Marine Corps during World War II, in October 1942, with the First Armored Amphibian Battalion. He remained active in United States Marine Corps Reserve until 1960 and retired with rank of lieutenant colonel. Denney resumed the practice of law in Fairbury from 1945 to 1967, becoming Jefferson County attorney from 1946 to 1951 and Fairbury city attorney from 1951 to 1956. He was Chairman of the Jefferson County Republican Party, and then Chairman of the Nebraska Republican Party. He was elected to the Ninetieth and Ninety-first United States Congresses serving from January 3, 1967 to January 3, 1971. He did not run for reelection to the Ninety-second United States Congress.

Federal judicial service

On January 28, 1971, Denney was nominated by President Richard Nixon to a new seat on the United States District Court for the District of Nebraska created by 84 Stat. 294. He was confirmed by the United States Senate on March 4, 1971, and received his commission on March 5, 1971. He assumed senior status due to a certified disability on April 16, 1981, serving in that capacity until his death on June 26, 1981, in Omaha, Nebraska. He was buried in Fairbury Cemetery, in Fairbury.

Memberships

Denney was a member of the Presbyterian Church, the American Bar Association, the American Legion, Veterans of Foreign Wars, Phi Sigma Kappa, the Freemasons, Knights Templar (Freemasonry), the Shriners and the Lions.

Honor

On December 23, 1981 the Robert V. Denney Federal Building and Courthouse in Lincoln, Nebraska was named by President Ronald Reagan.

See also

References

Sources
 
 
 Robert V Denney at the United States District Court - District of Nebraska*  Retrieved on 2008-04-02
 

1916 births
1981 deaths
American Presbyterians
Peru State College alumni
University of Nebraska alumni
Creighton University School of Law alumni
District attorneys in Nebraska
United States Marine Corps officers
Judges of the United States District Court for the District of Nebraska
United States district court judges appointed by Richard Nixon
20th-century American judges
Republican Party members of the United States House of Representatives from Nebraska
20th-century American politicians
People from Fairbury, Nebraska
Politicians from Council Bluffs, Iowa